Miho Dukov (born 29 October 1955) is a Bulgarian former wrestler who competed in the 1976 Summer Olympics and in the 1980 Summer Olympics.

References

External links 
 

1955 births
Living people
Olympic wrestlers of Bulgaria
Wrestlers at the 1976 Summer Olympics
Wrestlers at the 1980 Summer Olympics
Bulgarian male sport wrestlers
Olympic silver medalists for Bulgaria
Olympic medalists in wrestling
Medalists at the 1980 Summer Olympics
20th-century Bulgarian people
21st-century Bulgarian people